Gianfranco Agostino Gardin  (born 15 March 1944) is Archbishop-Bishop of Treviso.

Gardin was born at San Polo di Piave, in the Province of Treviso, Italy. In 1946, when he was about two years old, his family moved to Venice, where he grew up.

He joined the Order of Conventual Franciscan Friars, becoming a solemnly professed member on 4 October 1965. He was ordained a priest on 21 March 1970 and continued his studies in Padua and Rome.

He taught moral theology in Padua from 1973 to 1998. He founded and edited the periodical Credere oggi, whose title means "Believing Today".

In 1988 he became provincial superior of his order and in 1996 117th Minister General, a post he held until 2002.

On 10 July 2006 he was named titular Archbishop of Cissa  (transferred to Torcello in November 2007) and Secretary of the Congregation for Institutes of Consecrated Life and Societies of Apostolic Life. He was consecrated bishop on 26 August 2006.

On 18 December 2009, Pope Benedict XVI appointed him Archbishop-Bishop of Treviso.

References

External links
 Naming of the Archbishop-Bishop of Treviso, Italy

1944 births
Living people
Bishops of Treviso
Roman Catholic archbishops in Italy
Members of the Congregation for Institutes of Consecrated Life and Societies of Apostolic Life
20th-century Roman Catholics
21st-century Roman Catholics
Conventual Friars Minor
Ministers General of the Order of Friars Minor Conventual
Conventual Franciscan bishops